Charles Theodore 'Theo' Harding (26 May 1860 – 13 July 1919) was an English-born international rugby union player who played club rugby for Newport and international rugby for Wales. Harding was an all-round sportsman and also captained Newport Hockey Club in their very first season.

Rugby career
Harding was one of the first Newport players and was given the captaincy of the club in the 1887/88 and the 1888/89 season. During the 1888 Harding twice faced the first overseas touring team the New Zealand Māoris. The first occasion was also Harding's first cap for Wales, when under the captaincy of Frank Hill, the Welsh team beat the tourists five points to nil. Four days later, on 26 December, Harding led his Newport team against the Māori's, but without star player and Welsh legend Arthur Gould, Newport's supporters were not optimistic of success. They were proven right when the Māoris won three tries to nil.

In 1889, Harding was selected to represent Wales twice as part of the Home Nations Championship. Wales lost both games of the tournament against Scotland and Ireland, and Harding was not chosen to represent his country again.

International matches played
Wales (rugby union)
  1889
  1888
  1889

Bibliography

References 

1860 births
1919 deaths
English rugby union players
Newport RFC players
Rugby union forwards
Rugby union players from Manchester
Wales international rugby union players
Welsh male field hockey players